This is a list of songs written by Brian Holland, Lamont Dozier, and Eddie Holland.  In most cases the original recordings were for Motown, for whom the three were contracted until 1968.  They continued to have success after establishing the Invictus and Hot Wax labels, in some cases using the writing pseudonym "Edyth Wayne" (in various spellings). 

The article also lists songs written by any of the three writers, sometimes in collaboration with others.

For a list of their production credits, see Holland–Dozier–Holland#Production.

Chart hits and other notable songs written by Holland, Dozier and Holland

Other chart hits and notable songs written by Brian Holland alone or with others

Other chart hits and notable songs written by Lamont Dozier

Other chart hits and notable songs written by Eddie Holland Jr. with others

See also
Holland-Dozier-Holland

References

Holland, Dozier, Holland
American rhythm and blues songs